Elaphrus clairvillei is a species of ground beetle in the subfamily Elaphrinae. It was described by William Kirby in 1837.

References

Elaphrinae
Beetles described in 1837